Virginia Gentleman is a brand of bourbon whiskey distilled in Kentucky and re-distilled in Virginia. The brand's motto was "The Aristocrat of Them All" (sometimes rendered as "The Aristocrats of Them All" when advertised with Smith Bowman Distilleries' Fairfax County Bourbon).

Products
Virginia Gentleman is an 80-proof (40 percent alcohol) whiskey. The distillery also offers a 90-proof small batch version. Both are triple-distilled.

History
Virginia Gentleman's producer, A. Smith Bowman Distillery, was founded in 1934 by Abram Smith Bowman and his sons, Smith and DeLong. It was originally based on the Bowman family's Sunset Hills Farm in Fairfax County, Virginia, in what later became the planned community of Reston. In 1988, it relocated to Spotsylvania County, near Fredericksburg, into the former FMC Corp. cellophane plant. The distillery used to be an independent family operation, but it has been owned since 2003 by the Buffalo Trace Distillery of Frankfort, Kentucky, which provides the unfinished distillate that becomes Virginia Gentleman. (Buffalo Trace is itself a unit of Sazerac Company, an international beverage corporation based in Metairie, Louisiana.) The company has since expanded its production into hot sauces and barbecue sauces under the Virginia Gentleman label.

Virginia Gentleman's former label depicted a Revolution-era scene of two white men being served by a black footman (presumably a slave), all three in aristocratic dress, standing in front of a plantation-style manor. By at least the 1970s the label was redesigned with the black footman becoming white. Virginia Gentleman's motto, "The Aristocrat of Them All", was discontinued some time after, at least from appearing on the label. The label as of 2014 depicted three men in a similar arrangement, none of which are black or a servant.

References

External links
 A. Smith Bowman Distillery
 American Whiskey — Yes, Virginia, there is a Gentleman
 Proof66.com Liquor Ratings and Reviews 

Bourbon whiskey
Sazerac Company brands